Montgomery Warner (born 1 December 1955) is a Vincentian cricketer. He played in two first-class and seven List A matches for the Windward Islands from 1978 to 1981.

See also
 List of Windward Islands first-class cricketers

References

External links
 

1955 births
Living people
Saint Vincent and the Grenadines cricketers
Windward Islands cricketers